Veronica Mars is an American television series created by Rob Thomas. The series ran for four seasons; it premiered on September 22, 2004, during UPN's last two years, and ended on May 22, 2007, after a season on UPN's successor, The CW. The series balances murder mystery, high school and college drama, featuring social commentary with sarcasm and off-beat humor in a style often compared to film noir. Set in the fictional town of Neptune, Veronica Mars starred Kristen Bell as the title character, a student who progressed from high school to college during the series while moonlighting as a private investigator under the wing of her detective father. Episodes have a distinct structure: Veronica solves a different "case of the week" while continually trying to solve a season-long mystery. The first two seasons of the series have a season-long mystery arc, in which the conflict is introduced in the first episode of the season and resolved in the finale. The third season takes on a different format, focusing on smaller mystery arcs that last the course of several episodes.

The first season's run of 22 episodes garnered an average of 2.5 million viewers per episode in the United States. The second season decreased to an average of 2.3 million viewers; however, it included the series' highest rated episode with 3.6 million viewers. The third and final season saw an increase to an average of 2.5 million viewers. Veronica Mars appeared on a number of fall television best lists, and garnered a number of awards and nominations. At the 2007 CW Upfront, Ostroff announced that Veronica Mars was not part of the new primetime lineup, and in June 2007, TV Guide writer Michael Ausiello confirmed that the cancellation of Veronica Mars was official. In September 2018, an eight-episode fourth season was confirmed by Hulu, which was released on July 19, 2019.

Series overview

Episodes

Season 1 (2004–05) 

The first season revolves around Veronica Mars (Kristen Bell), a high school student and private investigator in the fictional coastal Southern California town of Neptune. As the daughter of well-respected County Sheriff Keith Mars (Enrico Colantoni), the biggest problem in Veronica's life was getting dumped by her boyfriend, Duncan Kane (Teddy Dunn). But when her best friend Lilly Kane (Amanda Seyfried) is murdered, Veronica's life falls apart. Veronica's father accuses Lilly's father, popular software billionaire Jake Kane (Kyle Secor), of being involved in the murder. This provokes Neptune's wrath, and Keith is ousted and replaced by the new sheriff Don Lamb (Michael Muhney) in a recall election. Veronica's mother, Lianne Mars (Corinne Bohrer), develops a drinking problem and leaves town. When Veronica's "09er" friends—wealthy students from the fictional 90909 ZIP Code—force her to choose between them and her father, Veronica decides to work part-time in her father's newly opened private investigation agency, Mars Investigations. She helps her father solve cases and conducts her own investigations on behalf of friends and acquaintances at school.

Veronica discovers new evidence which suggests that Abel Koontz (Christian Clemenson), the man imprisoned after confessing to Lilly's murder, is innocent. As Veronica delves deeper into the murder case, she also works on other investigations, seeks her mother's whereabouts and deals with the aftermath of being drugged and raped during an "09er" party. Veronica, no longer part of the school's wealthy in-crowd, makes some new friends: Wallace Fennel (Percy Daggs III), Neptune High basketball star; Eli "Weevil" Navarro (Francis Capra), leader of the PCHers, a Latino biker gang named after the Pacific Coast Highway; and Cindy "Mac" Mackenzie (Tina Majorino), Neptune High's resident computer genius. Using her friends' resources, as well as those provided by her father and his contacts, Veronica gains a reputation for sleuthing and finds her skills in increasingly high demand at her school. Things get more complicated when Veronica falls into a relationship with Lilly's ex-boyfriend Logan Echolls (Jason Dohring), who for a time held Veronica partly responsible for Lilly's death and went out of his way to harass her.

Season 2 (2005–06) 

The second season adds three regular cast members: new character Jackie Cook (Tessa Thompson), and first season recurring characters Dick Casablancas (Ryan Hansen) and Cassidy "Beaver" Casablancas (Kyle Gallner). The season begins with the introduction of two new cases: When a school bus full of Neptune High students plunges off a cliff, killing almost everyone on board, Veronica makes it her mission to discover why the bus crashed. Meanwhile, Logan is accused of killing PCH biker gang member Felix Toombs after drunkenly picking a fight with Weevil and the PCHers. Partway through the season, Weevil becomes convinced of Logan's innocence and they team up to find the real killer. Veronica's life returns to much the way it was before Lilly's death: having broken up with Logan during the summer, she reunites with Duncan and is somewhat accepted by the "09ers". However, her private-eye sideline and tough persona keep her from being truly assimilated back into the rich crowd. "09ers" Dick and Cassidy deal with a gold-digging stepmother, Kendall Casablancas (Charisma Carpenter), with whom they are left when their father flees the country while under investigation for real estate fraud. Wallace discovers that his biological father is alive and takes a romantic interest in Jackie.

The mystery involving Logan and Weevil was the producers' attempt to give Bell some time off after the taxing first season. Thomas later considered the mystery arcs of the second season to have had "way too many suspects, way too many red herrings", necessitating a change for the third season. As Thomas had conceived the show as a one-year mystery, he decided to introduce and eliminate several characters in order to create an "equally fascinating mystery" for the series' second season. Thomas needed "new blood" since he felt unable to bring back the Kanes and the Echolls and "have them all involved in a new mystery". Teddy Dunn, who portrayed Duncan Kane, left the series midway through the season because Thomas felt that the Logan-Veronica-Duncan love triangle had run its course. He needed to put "other guys in her life" to keep the series fresh and attributed Dunn's removal to fan interest dominating the Logan-Veronica relationship, saying "it became clear that one suitor won out".

Season 3 (2006–07) 

The third season introduces two new series regulars, Parker Lee (Julie Gonzalo) and Stosh "Piz" Piznarski (Chris Lowell). Piz was created so that Veronica could have a male friend of middle-class status rather than of upper-class, and his campus radio show serves as a narrative device to capture the mood of the university. Don Lamb and Mac, recurring characters in the first two seasons, are upgraded to series regulars. The season begins with Veronica, Logan, Wallace, Mac and Dick as freshmen at Hearst College. Piz and Parker are introduced as the respective roommates of Wallace and Mac. The first mystery is established when Parker becomes the latest victim of the Hearst serial rapist, a storyline begun in a second season episode. Veronica sets out to catch the rapist, partially motivated by guilt from failing to help Parker. The next mystery, a murder, commences in the same episode the rapist is discovered. During the season, Keith begins an affair with a married client, Wallace struggles to balance academics and sports, Mac begins dating again after previous failed relationships, and Dick has a breakdown and appeals to Logan for help. The season also chronicles Veronica and Logan's failing attempts to maintain their relationship in the face of Veronica's mistrust. The couple breaks up several times throughout the season, and Logan begins dating Parker while Veronica goes out with Piz. Keith is challenged in the sheriff's election by longtime rival P.I. Vinnie Van Lowe (Ken Marino), and faces charges after he destroys evidence incriminating Veronica.

The third season was initially planned to include three separate mysteries that would be introduced and resolved in a series of non-overlapping story arcs. Dawn Ostroff pointed out that the original format may confuse viewers, and the new format would allow new viewers to start watching at any point in the season. Inspired by the improvised thriller Bubble, Thomas started laying "subtle" motives for the second mystery during the first one, so that fans would have "a theory on whodunit" when it occurred. The first mystery took place over the first nine episodes. Originally, the second mystery was to be seven episodes long and the third mystery was to occur over the last six episodes of the season. When The CW ordered a 20-episode season instead of the usual 22 episodes, the second mystery arc was shortened from seven episodes to six, and the third mystery was changed from a six episode arc to a five-episode arc. After an eight-week hiatus for the series was announced, the final mystery was changed to five stand-alone episodes designed to be friendlier to new viewers. For the third mystery, Thomas had wanted to present a new situation where Wallace and Mac could be fully involved, "key players [with] really interesting stuff to do". This was a departure from previous seasons where "nice characters" had always been absent from the big mystery because no one was going to believe them to be a suspect.

Film (2014)

Season 4 (2019)

Ratings

References

External links 
 Veronica Mars at Hulu
 
 
 Mars Investigations

 
Lists of American comedy-drama television series episodes
Lists of American teen comedy television series episodes
Lists of American teen drama television series episodes

it:Veronica Mars#Episodi